The 2009 BNP Paribas Primrose Bordeaux was a professional tennis tournament played on outdoor red clay courts. It was part of the 2009 ATP Challenger Tour. It took place in Bordeaux, France between May 11 and May 17, 2009.

Singles entrants

Seeds

 Rankings are as of May 4, 2009.

Other entrants
The following players received wildcards into the singles main draw:
  Gastón Gaudio
  Romain Jouan
  Mathieu Rodrigues
  Alexandre Sidorenko

The following players received entry from the qualifying draw:
  Thierry Ascione
  Jean-René Lisnard
  Nicolas Renavand
  Stéphane Robert

The following player received special exempt into the main draw:
  Kevin Anderson
  Yuri Schukin

Champions

Singles

 Marc Gicquel def.  Mathieu Montcourt, 3–6, 6–1, 6–4

Doubles

 Pablo Cuevas /  Horacio Zeballos def.  Xavier Pujo /  Stéphane Robert, 4–6, 6–4, [10–4]

External links
2009 Draws
Official website
ITF search 

BNP Paribas Primrose Bordeaux
2009 in French tennis
BNP Paribas Primrose Bordeaux